Fabio Coltorti (born 3 December 1980) is a Swiss former footballer who played as a goalkeeper.

Club career
Coltorti was born in Kriens. During his career in his country he played with SC Kriens, FC Schaffhausen, FC Thun and Grasshopper Club Zürich, being first choice for the latter three sides.

On 30 August 2007, Coltorti penned a four-year contract with Spanish club Racing de Santander, for €1 million. During his first season with the Cantabrians he was mainly restricted to Copa del Rey matches, which also happened in the following; his La Liga debut came on 22 December 2007, in a 1–4 away loss against Sevilla FC.

From mid-December 2009 to February 2010, Coltorti had his longest league run in Racing's goal, benefitting from starter Toño's injury. In the first eight matches the team only lost once, at Villarreal CF (2–0), conceding just seven goals. He would finish the campaign with 23 league appearances, as they barely avoided relegation after finishing in 16th position.

Toño returned to full fitness for 2010–11, playing 37 of 38 league games. In mid-June 2011, Coltorti returned to his country and signed a one-year deal with FC Lausanne-Sport. During a league game against BSC Young Boys in early April of the following year he injured his little finger in the final minutes but, rather than leaving the pitch as his team had already used all three substitutes, he relocated his finger back into place and continued playing until the end of the 3–1 away win.

In the summer of 2012, Coltorti joined German club RB Leipzig, helping it promote from the Regionalliga Nord to the 2. Bundesliga in just two years. In late July 2014 he suffered a serious knee injury, going on to be sidelined for several months. On 24 April of the following year he became the first goalkeeper to score a winner from open play in any of the two major levels of German football, netting in the 90th minute for a 2–1 home victory over SV Darmstadt 98.

Coltorti's maiden and only appearance in the Bundesliga took place on 1 April 2017, as the 36-year-old was in goal during the 4–0 home win against Darmstadt. He announced his retirement in August 2018, with a testimonial match due to be held in his honour the following year.

International career
Coltorti was called up to the 2006 FIFA World Cup despite having only one cap for the Switzerland national team, won in a friendly with Scotland on 1 March 2006. He also appeared twice for the under-21 side.

References

External links

1980 births
Living people
Swiss men's footballers
Association football goalkeepers
Swiss Super League players
Swiss Challenge League players
SC Kriens players
FC Schaffhausen players
FC Thun players
Grasshopper Club Zürich players
FC Lausanne-Sport players
La Liga players
Racing de Santander players
Bundesliga players
2. Bundesliga players
3. Liga players
RB Leipzig players
Switzerland under-21 international footballers
Switzerland international footballers
2006 FIFA World Cup players
Swiss expatriate footballers
Expatriate footballers in Spain
Expatriate footballers in Germany
Swiss expatriate sportspeople in Spain
Swiss expatriate sportspeople in Germany
People from Lucerne-Land District
Sportspeople from the canton of Lucerne